Juan Esnáider Ruiz (born 31 January 1992) is a Spanish footballer who plays as a forward.

Club career
Born in Madrid, Esnáider graduated from Villarreal CF's youth system, and made his senior debut with the C team in 2011, in Tercera División. On 9 January 2012, he signed with CF Rayo Majadahonda of the same level.

Esnáider joined amateurs Las Rozas CF in the summer of 2012 and, in July of the following year, he moved to Real Zaragoza's reserves. He appeared in his first game as a professional on 9 March 2014, coming on as a late substitute for Luis García in a 1–1 home draw against RCD Mallorca in the Segunda División. He scored his first goal in the competition seven days later, but in a 4–2 loss at SD Ponferradina.

On 1 September 2014, Esnáider terminated his contract with the Aragonese club and signed for neighbouring SD Huesca hours later. On 3 August 2015, after achieving promotion to the second tier, he moved to CD Toledo.

After a career-best 12 goals in his one season, in June 2016 Esnáider moved abroad for the first time to FC Lausanne-Sport of the Swiss Super League. He made his debut on 16 September in the last 32 of the national cup, scoring in a 3–1 away defeat to FC Köniz. His sole other appearance was his top-flight debut on 2 October late into a 4–1 home win over AC Lugano.

Esnáider subsequently returned to Spain's third tier from July 2017, with Mérida AD, CD Tudelano and CDA Navalcarnero. On 17 January 2021, he scored twice in a 3–1 home victory against La Liga club SD Eibar in the round of 32 of the Copa del Rey.

Personal life
Esnáider's father, also named Juan, was also a footballer and a forward. He too represented Zaragoza, and was a full international for Argentina. His younger brother Fernando died aged 17 in 2012, from a terminal illness. 

The family surname, originally spelled Schneider, came from Volga German ancestors.

References

External links

1992 births
Living people
People of Volga German descent
Spanish people of Argentine descent
Spanish people of German descent
Spanish footballers
Footballers from Madrid
Association football forwards
Segunda División players
Segunda División B players
Tercera División players
Villarreal CF C players
CF Rayo Majadahonda players
Las Rozas CF players
Real Zaragoza B players
Real Zaragoza players
SD Huesca footballers
CD Toledo players
Mérida AD players
CD Tudelano footballers
CDA Navalcarnero players
Swiss Super League players
FC Lausanne-Sport players
Veikkausliiga players
Kotkan Työväen Palloilijat players
Spanish expatriate footballers
Expatriate footballers in Switzerland
Expatriate footballers in Finland
Spanish expatriate sportspeople in Switzerland
Spanish expatriate sportspeople in Finland